Sison, officially the Municipality of Sison (Surigaonon: Lungsod nan Sison), is a 5th class municipality in the province of Surigao del Norte, Philippines. According to the 2020 census, it has a population of 14,290 people.

History
Through Executive Order No. 357, issued by President Carlos P. Garcia on September 15, 1959, six barrios of then-municipality of Surigao were organized into the municipality of Sison.

Geography

Barangays
Sison is politically subdivided into 12 barangays.
 Biyabid
 Gacepan
 Ima
 Lower Patag
 Mabuhay
 Mayag
 Poblacion (San Pedro)
 San Isidro
 San Pablo
 Tagbayani
 Tinogpahan
 Upper Patag

Climate

Demographics

The Surigaonon language is widely spoken, while Cebuano, Filipino and English are also used.

Economy

See also
 Lake Mainit Development Alliance

References

External links
Sison Profile at PhilAtlas.com
  Sison Profile at the DTI Cities and Municipalities Competitive Index
Municipal Website Blog of Sison
[ Philippine Standard Geographic Code]
Philippine Census Information
Local Governance Performance Management System

Municipalities of Surigao del Norte